Westerleigh may refer to:

Westerleigh, a village in South Gloucestershire, England
Westerleigh, Staten Island, a neighborhood in Staten Island, New York, USA.
Westerleigh Junction, a railway junction in Gloucestershire, England